The 2014 European Junior Swimming Championships were held from 9–13 July 2014 in Dordrecht, Netherlands. The Championships were organized by LEN, the European Swimming League, and were held in a 50-meter pool. Per LEN rules, competitors have age 15 or 16 for girls and 17 or 18 for boys.

Results

Boys

Girls

Mixed Events

Medal table

Participating countries 
42 countries will take part in 2014 European Junior Swimming Championships with total of 511 swimmers.

References

External links 
 

European Junior Swimming Championships
European Junior Swimming Championships, 2014
International aquatics competitions hosted by the Netherlands
2014 in Dutch sport
Swimming competitions in the Netherlands
Sports competitions in Dordrecht
July 2014 sports events in Europe
Swimming